Harry Travis (26 December 1911 – 1982) was an English footballer who played as a centre forward. He was born in Manchester.

Travis had played for Leeds United before being signed on a free transfer by Dick Ray for Bradford City in June 1935. He played just two seasons at City scoring 20 league goals in 44 games, as well as three FA Cup goals in five games. One of those FA Cup games was against Derby County when the young forward impressed enough to be signed by Derby—along with Alf Jeffries—the following season.

References

1911 births
1982 deaths
Footballers from Manchester
English footballers
Manchester City F.C. players
Oldham Athletic A.F.C. players
Accrington Stanley F.C. (1891) players
Leeds United F.C. players
Bradford City A.F.C. players
Derby County F.C. players
Tranmere Rovers F.C. players
English Football League players
Association football forwards